Weir is a surname. It may refer to:

People
 Alison Weir (born 1951), British writer and historian
 Alison Weir (activist), American activist and writer
 Amanda Weir (born 1986), American Olympic swimmer 
 Andrew Weir, 1st Baron Inverforth (1865–1955), British businessman and minister
 Andy Weir (born 1972), American science fiction writer
 Andy Weir (footballer) (born 1937), Scottish footballer
 Arabella Weir (born 1957), British actress
 Barbara Weir (c. 1945–2023), Indigenous Australian artist and politician
 Benjamin Weir (1923–2016), American missionary held hostage in Lebanon in 1985
 Bill Weir (born 1967), American television journalist
 Bob Weir (born 1947), American guitar player, a founding member of the Grateful Dead
 Bruce Weir (born 1943), New Zealand geneticist
 Caroline Weir (born 1995), Scottish footballer
 David Weir (footballer) (1863–1933), English footballer
 David Weir (journalist)
 David Weir (athlete) (born 1979), British Paralympic wheelchair athlete
 David Weir (Scottish footballer) (born 1970)
 Doddie Weir (1970–2022), Scottish rugby player
 Elizabeth Weir (born 1948), Canadian politician and lawyer
 Erin Weir (born 1982), Canadian politician
 Fred Weir, Canadian journalist
 Frank Weir (cricketer) (1903–1969), New Zealand cricketer
 Gillian Weir (born 1941), New Zealand organist
 Graham Weir (born 1984), Scottish footballer 
 Harrison Weir (1824–1906), English writer and artist
 J. Alden Weir (1852–1919), American painter
 James Weir (disambiguation), various people named James, Jim or Jimmy Weir
 Jeremy Weir (born 1964), Australian geologist, banker and businessman, CEO of Trafigura
 John Ferguson Weir (1841–1926), American painter and sculptor
 Johnny Weir (born 1984), American figure skater
 Judith Weir (born 1954), British composer
 Leonard Weir (born 1928), Australian actor
 Lindsay Weir (cricketer) (1908–2003), New Zealand Test cricketer
 Michael or Mike Weir (disambiguation), various people
 Molly Weir (1910–2004), British actress
 Norman Weir (1893–1961), New Zealand major general
 Peter Weir (born 1944), Australian film director
 Peter Weir, Baron Weir of Ballyholme (born 1968), Northern Ireland politician
 Peter Weir (footballer) (born 1958), Scottish footballer
 Phil Weir (1901–1963), Scottish footballer
 Robert Weir (disambiguation), various people
 Robbie Weir (born 1988), Northern Irish footballer
 Stephnie Weir (born 1967), American actress, comedian and writer
 Thomas Weir (1599–1670), Scottish Covenanter and presumed occultist
 Thomas Weir (American soldier) (1838–1876), American cavalry captain who attempted to come to the aid of George Armstrong Custer at Custer's Last Stand
 Tom Weir (1914–2006), Scottish mountain climber, author and broadcaster
 Walter Weir (1929–1985), Canadian politician

Fictional characters
 Brett Weir, in The Jerky Boys: The Movie
 Elizabeth Weir (Stargate), in the television series Stargate Atlantis and Stargate SG-1
 Lindsay Weir (Freaks and Geeks), in the television series Freaks and Geeks

English-language surnames